Harunabad may refer to:
Haroonabad, Bahawalnagar, Pakistan
Harunabad, East Azerbaijan, a village in Iran
Harunabad, Hamadan, a village in Iran
Harunabad, alternate name of Eslamabad-e Gharb, a city in Iran
Harunabad-e Olya, Zanjan Province, Iran
Harunabad-e Sofla, Zanjan Province, Iran